Richard Joseph Bassi (January 1, 1915 – August 12, 1973) was an American football offensive lineman in the National Football League (NFL) for the Washington Redskins, Chicago Bears, Philadelphia Eagles, and the Pittsburgh Steelers.  He also played for the San Francisco 49ers of the All-America Football Conference.  Bassi played college football at the University of Santa Clara and was drafted in the fourth round of the 1937 NFL Draft.

References

1915 births
1973 deaths
American football offensive linemen
Chicago Bears players
People from San Luis Obispo, California
Philadelphia Eagles players
Pittsburgh Steelers players
San Francisco 49ers (AAFC) players
Santa Clara Broncos football players
Santa Clara University alumni
Washington Redskins players
Players of American football from California
San Francisco 49ers players